Isobutyryl-CoA dehydrogenase, mitochondrial is an enzyme that in humans is encoded by the ACAD8 gene on chromosome 11.

The protein encoded by ACAD8 is a mitochondrial protein belongs to the acyl-CoA dehydrogenase family of enzymes, which function to catalyze the dehydrogenation of acyl-CoA derivatives in the metabolism of fatty acids or branched-chain amino acids. ACAD8 functions in catabolism of the branched-chain amino acid valine.

Structure 
ACAD8 functions as a homotetramer and has an overall structure is similar to other acyl-CoA dehydrogenases. The functional protein contains an NH2-terminal alpha-helical domain, a medial beta-strand domain and a C-terminal alpha-helical domain.

Clinical significance 

Mutations in ACAD8 have been linked to isobutyryl-CoA dehydrogenase deficiency. Most patients with isobutyryl-CoA dehydrogenase deficiency are asymptotic, but children have also been observed to develop dilated cardiomyopathy.

Function 

ACAD8 is an isobutyryl-CoA dehydrogenase that functions in the catabolism of branched-chain amino acids including valine, and shows high reactivity toward isobutyryl-CoA. ACAD8 is responsible for the third step in the breakdown of valine and converts isobutyryl-CoA into methylacrylyl-CoA.

References

External links

Further reading 

 
 
 
 
 

Human proteins